The Middle Branch of the Piscataquog River is a  river in southern New Hampshire in the United States. It is a tributary of the South Branch Piscataquog River, part of the Merrimack River watershed.

The Middle Branch begins at the outlet of Haunted Lake in the eastern part of Francestown. The river travels east-northeast through the town of New Boston, entering Weare, where it turns abruptly south to reenter New Boston and join the South Branch.

See also

List of rivers of New Hampshire

References

Tributaries of the Merrimack River
Rivers of New Hampshire
Rivers of Hillsborough County, New Hampshire